Maison Close is a French television series which premiered on Canal+ on October 4, 2010. The series was developed by Mabrouk El Mechri and is based on a concept created by Jacques Ouaniche. It is a drama set in a nineteenth-century Parisian brothel.

On December 7, 2010, Canal + renewed Maison Close for a second season which premiered on February 4, 2013. But in May 2013, the series had been cancelled by Canal+ after the second season, following a decline in ratings.

Premise
Paris, 1871. In Le Paradis, a luxury brothel, three women try to escape from their troublesome circumstances. Vera is 35 years old, the end of her career as a prostitute drawing nearer. She puts all her hopes on her main client, the only one rich enough to redeem her debt. Hortense is the madam of Le Paradis. She must hold on to her girls whilst dealing with an extortionist from the Parisian suburbs. Rose arrives in search of her mother, a former prostitute. She is trapped with a pimp and forcibly conscripted into Le Paradis.

Cast and characters

Main
 Anne Charrier as Véra
 Valérie Karsenti as  Hortense Gaillac.
 Jemima West as Rosalie "Rose" Tranier
 Catherine Hosmalin as Marguerite Fourchon
 Clémence Bretécher as Valentine
 Deborah Grall as Bertha
 Blandine Bellavoir as Angèle
 Nicolas Briançon as Pierre Gaillac (season 1)
 Michaël Cohen as Louis Mosca (season 2)

Recurring
 Dany Verissimo as Camélia
 Sébastien Libessart as Torcy

 Season 1
 Dan Herzberg as Gaston Lupin
 Serge Dupuy as Brice Caboche
 Lannick Gautry as Edgar
 Arnaud Binard as Francis Arnoult
 Antoine Chappey as Charles Blondin
 Garlan Le Martelot as Edmond Blondin
 Juana Pereira da Silva as Louison "Louise"
 Olivier Claverie as senator Gaudissart
 Quentin Baillot as baron du Plessis
 Pierre Casadei as the general

 Season 2
 Fatou N'Diaye as Pauline
 Martin Loizillon as Bak
 Lubna Gourion as Jeanne
 Michaël Abiteboul as Kertel
 Jean-Marie Frin as commissioner Angélus
 Aurélien Wiik as the doctor 
 Susana Blazer as Zoe
 David Salles as Paul
 Elmano Sancho as Delvaux
 Sophie-Charlotte Husson as Joséphine
 Francis Seleck as Bayle
 Sylvain Rougerie as Lubeck
 Afonso Lagarto as Themier le Borgne

Episodes

Season 1 (2010)
The first season premiered on Canal+ on October 4, 2010. The season finale aired on October 25, 2010.
 Épisode 1
 Épisode 2
 Épisode 3
 Épisode 4
 Épisode 5
 Épisode 6
 Épisode 7
 Épisode 8

Season 2 (2013)
The second season premiered on Canal+ on February 4, 2013. The season finale aired on February 25, 2013.
 Épisode 1
 Épisode 2
 Épisode 3
 Épisode 4
 Épisode 5
 Épisode 6
 Épisode 7
 Épisode 8

Production and development
Jacques Ouaniche imagined the series in 2007, taking as a starting point a "trapped young girl forced to prostitute in a nineteenth century Parisian brothel".

Production of the first season began on October, 2009 and ended on January, 2010 in Lisbon, Portugal.

On December 7, 2010, Canal + renewed Maison Close for a second season to consist of 8 episodes. Production of the second season began on January, 2012 and ended on May, 2012 in Lisbon, Portugal.

In May 2013, the series had been cancelled by Canal+ after the second season, following a decline in ratings.

Home media release
 The first season was released in France on DVD on October 26, 2010, and on Blu-ray on March 1, 2013. The second season was released on both DVD and Blu-ray on March 1, 2013. The complete serie was released on DVD and Blu-ray on October 9, 2013.
 The first season was released in United Kingdom on DVD and Blu-ray on September 3, 2012. The second season was released on DVD and Blu-ray on August 19, 2013. 
 The first season was released in United States on DVD and Blu-ray on January 27, 2015. The second season was released on DVD and Blu-ray on June 16, 2015.

Adaptations
On November 9, 2012, it was revealed that an English-language adaptation was in development and that HBO and Mark Wahlberg and Stephen Levinson's Leverage would develop the project. The remake should be identical to the original version except for the cast and the language. Although the project has not been canceled, HBO no longer communicates about it since the announcement.

References

External links
 
 

2010s French drama television series
2010 French television series debuts
2013 French television series endings
Serial drama television series
Television series set in the 19th century
French-language television shows
Television shows set in France
French LGBT-related television shows
Television shows set in Paris
Canal+ original programming
Prostitution in television
Works about prostitution in Paris
Television shows filmed in Portugal